Sântandrei is a commune in Bihor County, Crișana, Romania. It is composed of two villages, Palota (Újpalota) and Sântandrei.

References

Communes in Bihor County
Localities in Crișana